Brownell Talbot College Preparatory School is an independent, co-educational, college preparatory day school located in Omaha, Nebraska, United States. It serves students from preschool through grade 12.

History 
In the mid-19th century, Omaha joined progressive cities that were establishing schools for girls' education. The Episcopal Church founded Brownell Hall, an all-girls secondary boarding school three miles north of Omaha in Saratoga. It officially opened on September 17, 1863. Located at present-day 400 North Happy Hollow, this private religious school was named after an Episcopal bishop of Connecticut, and was first located in the Saratoga Springs Hotel, a defunct resort. Students came to the school from Nebraska City, Bellevue, Florence, Fontanelle, Decatur and Omaha. The school moved to 16th and Jones in 1867, and in 1883 to 10th Street in downtown Omaha. In 1923 it moved to a central Omaha location. It became co-educational in 1963, ending 100 years of boarding girls. In 1968, the school became independent, breaking official ties with the Episcopal Church. Today it is the oldest school in continuous operation in Nebraska.

Notable alumni 
 Edith Abbott, economist, social worker, educator, and author
 Mellona Moulton Butterfield, china painter and teacher
 Chris Ware, graphic novelist
 John Watson, chess master and author

See also
 History of Omaha
 Education in Omaha, Nebraska

References

External links
 Official website

Schools in North Omaha, Nebraska
Educational institutions established in 1863
High schools in Omaha, Nebraska
Kountze family
Private high schools in Nebraska
Private middle schools in Nebraska
Private elementary schools in Nebraska
Preparatory schools in Nebraska
1863 establishments in Nebraska Territory